Liudys Masso Beliser is a paralympic athlete from Cuba competing mainly in category F10-11 throwing events.

Liudys was part of the Cuban team that competed in America in the 1996 Summer Paralympics, There she competed in all three throws winning the gold medal in the discus and the silver in the javelin.

References

Paralympic athletes of Cuba
Athletes (track and field) at the 1996 Summer Paralympics
Paralympic gold medalists for Cuba
Paralympic silver medalists for Cuba
Living people
Medalists at the 1996 Summer Paralympics
Year of birth missing (living people)
Paralympic medalists in athletics (track and field)
Cuban female discus throwers
Cuban female javelin throwers
Visually impaired discus throwers
Visually impaired javelin throwers
Paralympic discus throwers
Paralympic javelin throwers
20th-century Cuban women
20th-century Cuban people